The Hall of Mirrors is the central gallery of the Palace of Versailles

Hall of Mirrors may also refer to:

Places
Hall of Mirrors, a hall in Golestan Palace
House of mirrors or hall of mirrors, a room full of mirrors often found as an attraction at carnivals or amusement parks
Ossian's Hall of Mirrors, a shrine and view-house in Scotland.
Bonnington Pavilion, the ruines hall of mirrors at Corra Linn, Lanark.

Arts, entertainment, and media
Hall of Mirrors (film), a 2001 independent feature written and directed by Brad Osborne
"Hall of Mirrors", a song by Kraftwerk from their 1977 album Trans-Europe Express
"Hall of Mirrors", a song by The Distillers from their 2003 album Coral Fang
A Hall of Mirrors, a 1964 book written by Robert Stone
"Hall of Mirrors", a short story by Kurt Vonnegut in the collection Look at the Birdie (2009)
"Hall of Mirrors", a short story of Amber by Roger Zelazny (1996)

Other uses
Hall of mirrors effect, a visual anomaly in computer graphics